The Jacksonville Correctional Center  is a minimum-security state prison for men located in Jacksonville, Morgan County, Illinois, owned and operated by the Illinois Department of Corrections.  

The facility was opened in 1984 and has a capacity of 1628 inmates, a number that includes the associated Greene County Work Camp and Pittsfield Work Camp.

References

Prisons in Illinois
Buildings and structures in Morgan County, Illinois
1984 establishments in Illinois